Khatarnak  is a 2006 Indian Telugu-language action comedy film directed by choreographer-turned-director Amma Rajasekhar. Ravi Teja and Ileana D'Cruz play the lead roles. B. V. S. N. Prasad has produced this film. The film released on 14 December 2006 and was a box office failure. This movie is an unofficial remake of 2005 South Korean film Mr. Socrates

Plot 

Dasu (Ravi Teja) is the son of a counterfeit racketeer (Kota Srinivasa Rao). As his father goes to jail, Dasu becomes an orphan. He stops his education at 10th class and moves like a vagabond. On the other side, there is a smuggler who used to smuggle drugs and arms into the country. But an honest police officer (Prakash Raj) hatches a plan and sends one informer (Raja Ravindra) into their underworld. He stays with them for sometime and passes on information to the police, with the help of which the police were able to bust the smugglers team, though not the kingpin. The don's assistant, who was also a lawyer advises him to play the same trick and admit one of their henchmen into the police to get information from the reverse side. However, he should not be in police records but should be crooked and cunning. The smugglers team's search ends with Dasu. The group threatens Dasu and make him to play like a puppet in their hands. In order to push him inside the police department, he should at least pass tenth class. So, they admit him in a school, where he falls in love with a teacher Nakshatra (Ileana D'Cruz). However, she doesn't like him as he neither has good education nor good looks. After a few incidents, the don's right hand i.e., the lawyer tells Dasu to study well and become a police officer to win her love. Admitting the idea, Dasu turns a good student and gets through the exam. Later, he becomes a constable and gets posted in traffic. The smugglers unit hatches another plan and succeeds in pushing him in the crime police. After watching Dasu as a sincere police constable, Nakshatra too starts liking him. Soon, in a turn of events, Nakshatra's brother, who was a police informer, is killed in the hands of Dasu at the behest of the don. She chides Dasu and starts hating him. Dasu starts disliking his job as he became a police officer only to win her love. As he lost her love, Dasu turns against the don and finally kills him. Nakshatra learns from the lawyer that her brother actually died in the hands of the don, she reunites with Dasu and the film ends on a happy note.

Cast

Music 

The music of the film released on 15 November 2006 statewide. The film has six songs composed by M. M. Keeravani. The song "Aa Gaganamlo" has tunes borrowed from the song "The Next Episode" by American rapper Dr. Dre.

Reception 
Rediff.com critic G P Aditya Vardhan rated the film 1.5/5 and criticized the film for poor writing and direction. "The music by Keeravani is pathetic. So are the dance numbers. The double entendre and the bizarre stunts really hurt. Only a miracle can save this film," he wrote. Alluru Rahim of Zamin Ryot gave also a negative review for the film. Jeevi of Idlebrain.com wrote that "Director Amma Rajasekhar could not do the execution right". A critic from Full Hyderabad opined that "On the whole, this one is tolerable if you cannot find anything else to do".

References

External links

2006 films
2000s Telugu-language films
Indian action films
Films scored by M. M. Keeravani
2006 action films